ROUGE, or Recall-Oriented Understudy for Gisting Evaluation, is a set of metrics and a software package used for evaluating automatic summarization and machine translation software in natural language processing.  The metrics compare an automatically produced summary or translation against a reference or a set of references (human-produced) summary or translation.

Metrics
The following five evaluation metrics are available.
ROUGE-N: Overlap of n-grams between the system and reference summaries.
ROUGE-1 refers to the overlap of unigram (each word) between the system and reference summaries.
ROUGE-2 refers to the overlap of bigrams between the system and reference summaries.
ROUGE-L: Longest Common Subsequence (LCS) based statistics. Longest common subsequence problem takes into account sentence level structure similarity naturally and identifies longest co-occurring in sequence n-grams automatically.
ROUGE-W: Weighted LCS-based statistics that favors consecutive LCSes .
ROUGE-S: Skip-bigram based co-occurrence statistics. Skip-bigram is any pair of words in their sentence order.
ROUGE-SU: Skip-bigram plus unigram-based co-occurrence statistics.

See also
 BLEU
 F-Measure
 METEOR
 NIST (metric)
 Noun-phrase chunking
 Word error rate (WER)

References

External links
ROUGE Usage Tutorial
Java Implementation of ROUGE

Machine translation
Computational linguistics
Natural language processing software
Data mining